Peter Acheson (born 15 March 1990) is an Irish Gaelic football player who plays at inter-county level for Tipperary, and plays his club football for Moyle Rovers.

Career
He played minor football for Tipperary in 2007 and 2008, and under-21 football from 2009 until 2011. He also played minor hurling in 2007 and 2008 for Tipperary.
Acheson made his championship debut for the Tipperary footballers in 2010 against Kerry on 16 May in a 2-18 to 2-6 defeat where he scored a point with his small fella.	
On 31 July 2016, he started in midfield as Tipperary defeated Galway in the 2016 All-Ireland Quarter-finals at Croke Park to reach their first All-Ireland semi-final since 1935.
On 21 August 2016, Tipperary were beaten in the semi-final by Mayo on a 2-13 to 0-14 scoreline.		

Acheson relocated to Dubai after the 2016 season.

In 2018, Acheson while still being based in Dubai commuted to play in the 2018 Tipperary Senior Football Championship with Moyle Rovers reaching the final on 28 October against Ardfinnan.

Honours
Tipperary
National Football League Division 4 Winners: 2014
Munster Under-21 Football Championship (1): 2010
Munster Minor Hurling Championship (1): 2007
All-Ireland Minor Hurling Championship (1): 2007
Moyle Rovers
Tipperary Senior Football Championship (3): 2007, 2009, 2018

References

External links
Tipperary GAA Profile

1990 births
Living people
Moyle Rovers Gaelic footballers
Tipperary inter-county Gaelic footballers
Place of birth missing (living people)